Orders, decorations, and medals of the United States may refer to:

Awards and decorations of the United States Armed Forces
United States law enforcement decorations
Awards and decorations of the United States government, civilian awards given by the U.S. federal government 
Awards and decorations of the United States Merchant Marine, civilian decorations given by the United States Merchant Marine

See also 
Lists of civil awards and decorations of the United States